The Segugio Italiano is either of two Italian breeds of dog of scent hound type, the wire-haired Segugio Italiano a Pelo Forte or the short-haired Segugio Italiano a Pelo Raso. Apart from the coat type, they are closely similar, and in some sources may be treated as a single breed; the Fédération Cynologique Internationale and the Ente Nazionale della Cinofilia Italiana treat them as separate. They are also genetically close to the other two Italian scent hound breeds, the Segugio Maremmano and the Segugio dell'Appennino. They are traditionally used for hunting hare, but may also be used in boar hunts.

In 2009 registrations in the national stud-book were 1740 of the wire-haired breed and 4500 of the short-haired.

History 

The origins of the breed are unknown but are believed to be ancient. In some Ancient Roman statues, including two in the Vatican Museums in Rome and one in the National Archaeological Museum in Naples, Diana the Huntress is portrayed accompanied by a hunting dog which is thought to show some similarity to the modern Segugio Italiano. 

Two closely similar skeletons of dogs of greyhound or scent hound type from a seventh-century Lombard necropolis at Povegliano in the province of Verona were described in 1995; they show some morphological similarity to the modern Segugio, except that they are taller, with a height at the withers estimated at 64 cm.

Dogs of this type were much used during the Italian Renaissance in elaborate hunts with a large number of hunt servants and hunt followers mounted on horseback.

Dogs similar to the modern Segugio, both smooth-haired and rough-haired, were shown in Milan in 1886, but there was at this time no clear distinction of breed. By the end of the war the breed was at risk of disappearing.

A new breed society was formed in 1947, with the name ; in that year, the total number registered in the two national stud-books (LOI and LIR) was 69. The breed standard was revised by the cynologist Giuseppe Solaro. In 1948 there were 120 new registrations.

The rough-haired breed was fully accepted by the Fédération Cynologique Internationale in 1956, and the smooth-haired breed in 1993. In 2015, registrations in the national stud-book were 3647 of the short-haired breed, and 1106 of the rough-haired.

It has been exported to a number of countries.

Characteristics 

There are two breeds of Segugio Italiano, the wire-haired  and the short-haired . Apart from the coat type, they are closely similar, and in some sources may be treated as a single breed, although the Fédération Cynologique Internationale and the Ente Nazionale della Cinofilia Italiana treat them as separate. Genetic comparisons have found the two to be almost indistinguishable, and also to be genetically close to the other two Italian scent hound breeds, the Segugio Maremmano and the Segugio dell'Appennino. 

Two coat colours are recognised: any shade of fawn-coloured, varying from deep fox-red to very pale; and black-and-tan. Some white markings to the face and chest are tolerated.

It is of medium size. When seen from the side, the body is approximately square in shape – the body length is the same as the height at the withers. Wire-haired dogs stand  and weigh , bitches are about  shorter and weigh on average  less. The short-haired breed is approximately  smaller, with weights in the same range. 

It shares certain physical characteristics with both scent hounds and sight hounds. It has long legs, tucked-up loins and a roached (slightly convex) back more typical of a sight hound. The head has many scent hound features including low-set pendulous ears although it has a long, tapering muzzle with thin lips that are not pendulous. The tail is long and tapered, and is typically carried high when hunting enabling them to be spotted easily when hunting.

Character
Traditionally kept as pack hounds, the Segugio Italiano is very stubborn; once on a scent trail they display a single-minded dedication to following it, much like the Bloodhound, although unlike the latter the Segugio Italiano also captures and kills game.

Use 
The Segugio Italiano was traditionally kept for the purposes of hunting. It is renowned for its keen scenting ability and its considerable stamina when hunting, staying in the field for up to 12 hours without a break; like most scent hounds it bays loudly when pursuing game. Its traditional quarry is hare, but it may also be used to hunt boar; it hunts well alone, in small groups, or in packs, with the hunters remaining stationary and the hounds driving game towards them to be shot.

In addition to its traditional role as a scent hound, the Segugio Italiano has increasingly been kept as a companion dog.

See also
 Dogs portal
 List of dog breeds

Notes

References 

Scent hounds
Dog breeds originating in Italy
FCI breeds